Jerry Henry (February 5, 1956) is a former Democratic member of the Kansas House of Representatives, representing the 48th and 63rd district. He served from 1993 to 2003, 2003 to 2017, when he was succeeded by Republican John Eplee.

Henry is the executive director of Achievement Services for Northeast Kansas, which works with developmentally disabled adults.  Prior to his election to the House he served four years on the Atchison City Commission and one year as the city's mayor.

He and wife Linda have three children and five grandchildren.

Committee membership
 Appropriations
 Transportation
 Social Services Budget (Ranking Member)
 Joint Committee on Corrections and Juvenile Justice Oversight
 Joint Committee on Home and Community Based Services Oversight

Major donors
The top 5 donors to Henry's 2008 campaign:
1. Kansas Optometric Assoc 	$750 	
2. Kansas Contractors Assoc 	$600 	
3. Kansans for Quality MHS 	$500 	
4. Ruffin, Phil 	$500 	
5. Kansas Medical Society 	$500

References

External links
 Kansas Legislature - Jerry Henry
 Project Vote Smart profile
 Kansas Votes profile
 State Surge - Legislative and voting track record
 Campaign contributions: 1996,1998,2000, 2002, 2004, 2006, 2008

Democratic Party members of the Kansas House of Representatives
People from Atchison, Kansas
Living people
21st-century American politicians
20th-century American politicians
1956 births